Jump the Gun is a 1997 South African film directed by Les Blair for Channel Four Films.

References

External links 
 
 
 

1997 films
English-language South African films
1990s English-language films